The 2022–23 season is the 110th in the history of Stade Malherbe Caen and their fourth consecutive season in the top flight. The club are participating in Ligue 2 and the Coupe de France.

Players 
As of 10 January 2023.

Out on loan

Transfers

In

Pre-season and friendlies

Competitions

Overall record

Ligue 2

League table

Results summary

Results by round

Matches 
The league fixtures were announced on 17 June 2022.

Coupe de France

Notes

References 

Stade Malherbe Caen seasons
Caen